Karet Tengsin is an administrative village in the Tanah Abang district of Indonesia. Its postal code is 10220.

See also 
 Tanah Abang
 List of administrative villages of Jakarta

Administrative villages in Jakarta